Multidesportivo Sporting is a multi-sports arena located in Lisbon, next to the Estádio José Alvalade and it is the home of many Sporting CP sports.

Organization
Floor -1

 Pools

Floor 0

 Table Tennis - Sports room with 50-seat bench
 Multifunctional gyms

Floor 2
 Gymnastics gyms
 Combat sports gyms

Floor 3
 Handball, basketball, futsal and volleyball training arena - bench with 150 seats

References 

Sporting CP
Indoor arenas in Portugal